HMS Fortitude was a 74-gun third-rate ship of the line of the Royal Navy, built by John Randall & Co. and launched on 23 March 1780 at Rotherhithe.

Under Captain Richard Bickerton, Fortitude served in the English Channel. In April 1781 she participated in the second relief of Gibraltar. On 5 August, Fortitude fought in the Battle of Dogger Bank as Parker's flagship. After a desperate, bloody battle in which neither combatant gained any advantage, both sides drew off.

French Revolutionary Wars

In 1793, under Captain William Young she sailed for the Mediterranean to join Admiral Sir Samuel Hood's fleet there.

On 7 February 1794 Fortitude, under the command of Captain William Young, and  attacked a tower at Mortella Point, on the coast of  Corsica. The tower, though manned by only 33 men and heavily damaged by the ships' guns, held out for two days before surrendering to land-based forces under Sir John Moore, having lost two men mortally wounded. In her unsuccessful bombardment, Fortitude suffered extensive damage to her hull, masts, rigging and sails, particularly from heated shot, and had three lower-deck guns disabled. In all, she lost six men killed and 56 men wounded, including eight dangerously. The design of the tower so impressed the British that they made it the model for Martello Towers that they would later construct in Great Britain and many of their colonies.

Under Captain Thomas Taylor Fortitude was involved in actions off Genoa on 13 March 1795, and Hyères on 13 July 1795. The action on 13 July was also indecisive, though the British captured a French 74-gun ship. Admiral Hotham resigned on 1 November 1795.

On 25 September 1795, Fortitude set sail for Britain with a large convoy. On 7 October 1795 the convoy sighted a large French squadron, off Cape St. Vincent, which sailed in pursuit of them. Before the French arrived, Censeur lost her fore topmast and had only a frigate's main mast left, rendering her useless. She was also lightly manned and short of powder. In the subsequent exchange the French recaptured Censeur, along with 30 ships of the convoy. The rest continued on to England.

Fate
Fortitude served as a prison ship from 1795 and as a powder hulk at Portsmouth from 1802. She was broken up there in 1820.

Citations and notes

References

 Lavery, Brian (2003) The Ship of the Line - Volume 1: The development of the battlefleet 1650-1850. Conway Maritime Press. .

External links
 

Ships built in Rotherhithe
Albion-class ships of the line (1763)
1780 ships